Veysian (also Romanized as Veysīān, Vaisiyan, Vaisyan, Vasīān, Veseyān, Veysīyān, and Voisiyan; also known as Cham Bāgh-e Veysīān; formerly, Mahmudvand (Persian: محمودوند), also Romanized as  Maḩmūdvand) is a city in and capital of Veysian District, in Dowreh County, Lorestan Province, Iran. At the 2006 census, its population was 1,817, in 429 families.

References

Towns and villages in Dowreh County
Cities in Lorestan Province